"" is the 26th single by Zard and was released 2 December 1998 under B-Gram Records label. It was released on the same day as the upcoming 27th single, Good Day. The single debuted at #3 rank first week. It charted for 8 weeks and sold over 205,000 copies.

Track list
All songs are written by Izumi Sakai.

composer: Masato Kitano/arrangement: Hirohito Furui
 (original karaoke)

References

1998 singles
Zard songs
Songs written by Izumi Sakai
Songs written by Masato Kitano
1998 songs